Chris Hartsburg (born May 30, 1980) is an American former professional ice hockey player and former Head Coach of the Erie Otters

He was selected by the New Jersey Devils in the 7th round (214th overall) of the 1999 NHL Entry Draft. Before entering the NHL, he played junior hockey for the Omaha Lancers and NCAA hockey for Colorado College. He was an assistant coach with the Everett Silvertips of the Western Hockey League from 2011 to 2013  before taking an assistant coaching position with the Erie Otters for the 2013-2014 season. From 2014 to 2017,  he was the head coach for the Lincoln Stars of the United States Hockey League.

Hartsburg is the son of former NHL player and coach Craig Hartsburg, and was born in Edina, while his father was a member of the Minnesota North Stars.

On June 20, 2017, Hartsburg was named the head coach of the Erie Otters of the Ontario Hockey League. 4 years before he was fired.

Career statistics

References

External links

1980 births
Albany River Rats players
American men's ice hockey centers
Colorado College Tigers men's ice hockey players
Colorado Eagles players
Ice hockey coaches from Minnesota
Living people
New Jersey Devils draft picks
Omaha Lancers players
Ice hockey players from Minnesota